WVVS-FM (90.9 FM) is a radio station broadcasting a college radio format, and licensed to serve Valdosta, Georgia, United States.  The station is owned and operated by the students of Valdosta State University, though unlike other college radio stations in the state, the "Board of the University System of Ga" is listed on the broadcast license, with VSU listed second.  It is known as Blaze FM, but was previously V91 until the summer of 2007.  The station started broadcasting on 26 July 1971 with a small number of watts and in monophonic only.

In early 2010, the station applied for and was granted a construction permit, allowing it to slightly change location (by a few arcseconds of latitude and longitude on campus), switch from an omnidirectional antenna to a directional antenna, reduce power, increase height, and switch from horizontal-only to vertical-only polarization on its radio antenna.  This will significantly reduce its broadcast range toward Hahira and Moody AFB in the northern part of Lowndes county, and slightly reduce it toward Lake Park in the south-southeast, but will slightly increase it toward the Brooks county panhandle in the west.

References

External links

VVS-FM
VVS
Radio stations established in 1971